Headingley (sometimes spelled Headingly) is a rural municipality in Manitoba, Canada. It is located directly west of Winnipeg and had a population of 3,579 people as of the 2016 census.

The Trans-Canada Highway and the Assiniboine River run through the municipality. The unincorporated community of Headingley is situated within the municipality along Manitoba Provincial Road 334 near the Trans-Canada Highway.

The municipality takes its name from the suburb of Headingley in the city of Leeds in West Yorkshire, England.

History 
The first permanent European residents of the present-day Headingley area are figured to have been Oliver Gowler (1814-1865) and his wife, Mary (Nee Lady Neville Braybrooke) (1816-1878), who came to Canada together in the fall of 1836, hired by the Hudson ’s Bay Company to work on their experimental farm at Red River.

First owning a farm in Fort Garry in 1846, the Gowlers fled westward after the 1852 Red River flood, whereupon they begun the first farm on Headingley soil. There, Oliver Gowler eventually became one of the most successful early farmers in what would become western Canada. James Cunningham, a member of Manitoba’s first Legislature (1870), also arrived in the area in 1853 following the 1852 flood.

In November 1852, Reverend Griffith Owen Corbett was sent from England and was tasked with organizing a new parish west of the Parish of St. James, itself created in 1850. Corbett established the parish of Headingley, naming it  after his sponsoring parish of the same name in Leeds, England, and immediately built a house where he conducted services.

In 1869, the area saw its first rope ferry, established at the Headingley Grand Passage. In the late 1860s, Reverend George Young, the first Methodist missionary in Red River, began to visit Headingley regularly. 

Following the passing of the federal Manitoba Act on 12 May 1870, which created the Province of Manitoba, provincial elections were held in November that year, upon which John Taylor was declared the first M.L.A of Headingley, with a majority of one vote—though the new Attorney General appointed James Cunningham to the seat on a "technicality." 

At this time, the area was divided, with north Headingley belonging to the Rural Municipality of Assiniboia and south Headingley to the RM of Charleswood.

In November 1904, telegraph service was extended to Headingley, but were still missing modern conveniences of a streetcar and voice telephone service. In 1911, Headingley received its first telephones, with 13 phones being listed in the first phone book.
In the early part of the 20th century, an interurban train, Route 29, operated by the Suburban Rapid Transit Company, Manitoba served the Headingley area; however, this line was discontinued in the 1930s. After the interurban cars stopped service, a diesel bus service was implemented. In the numbering of Winnipeg Transit routes since June 1984, Route 81 Headingley was the bus that serviced the area.

The Headingley Correctional Institution, a provincial gaol, was opened in October 1930 with an inmate population consisting of both males and females until 1931, when females were sent to Portage la Prairie. Capital punishment, via hangings, was carried out at the Institution from 1932 to 1952, wherein a total of 25 hangings took place.

Secession from Winnipeg to present day 
From 1 January 1972 until 31 December 1992, Headingley was part of the City of Winnipeg.
Initial discussions about Headingley seceding from Winnipeg began in March 1987 over concerns about municipal tax rates. A referendum was held on 14 November 1991 asking Headingley residents if they wanted to break away from Winnipeg.

It seceded from the larger city in 1993 after extensive complaints that the local needs of the mostly-rural community were not being met as part of a large urban city: they were not receiving water, sewage, access roads. Headingley residents wanted the City and Province to spend $4 million on extending water services to the community. As a result of the breakup, it is the only municipality besides Winnipeg in Statistics Canada's Manitoba Census Division No. 11.

In May 1993, the new municipality established its fire department, the Headingley Fire and Rescue Service, with  Alan Gaye as Acting Fire Chief along with 20 volunteer firefighters. The department became operational by September 15 that year, using a 1966 F800 Ford Fire truck purchased for $7,800 from Winkler's department.

In 2013, the Manitoba government decided to divide a  section of the Trans-Canada Highway that runs through Headingley, because it was notorious for vehicle accidents.

Mayors/reeves 
Since 1992, the Rural Municipality of Headingley has been led by the following reeves/mayors.

Local services 
Police service in Headingley is provided by the Stonewall/Headingley RCMP detachment, along with the Headingley Highway Patrol who are responsible for the highway system in and around the Headingley region. A provincial jail is also located in the municipality, called the Headingley Correctional Institution.

In terms of health services, Headingley falls within the jurisdiction of Manitoba's Southern Regional Health Authority.

The municipality is serviced by a 25-member volunteer fire department, which includes a first responders unit and operates out of the Headingley Fire Hall. Headingley is also a member of the Boyne River Mutual Aid Fire District, which provides backup and support services on an as-required basis.

For education, Headingley is home to Phoenix School, an elementary school (K-5) of the St. James-Assiniboia School Division.

Water 
The Cartier Regional Water Co-op manages the water supply to the R.M. of Headingley, as well as several other nearby rural municipalities such as Cartier, Rosser, Macdonald. The Headingley Water Treatment Plant is one of two operated by the Co-op, the other being located in Cartier. Intake source water comes from the Assiniboine River via a pipe, from where it is then moved to a facility on the site of the Headingley Correctional Centre River Intake Building where debris and silt are removed.

Recreation and local business 
Camp Manitou is a summer camp and year-round outdoor recreation facility located in Headingley.

Headingley has two community centres: the older Phoenix Community Centre (153 Seekings Street), and the newer $1.8-million Headingley Community Centre (5353 Portage Avenue). Headingley also houses four small churches, including Headingley United Church and Holy Trinity Anglican Church.

The Headingley Grand Trunk Trail is the abandoned rail line that runs through both the Rural Municipalities of Headingley and Cartier from the Perimeter Highway to Beaudry Park. The railway bed was originally built by the Grand Trunk Pacific Railway and was used from 1894-1972. The municipality is also home to a heritage museum about the Canadian petroleum industry, called Jim's Vintage Garages Heritage Museum.

Local businesses located in Headingley include T&T Seeds, Shelmerdine's Nurseries, Flying J, The Gates on Roblin, and Taillieu Construction.

Demographics 

2016 Census footnotes:

Notable people 

 James Cunningham ( – April 27, 1915), a member of Manitoba’s first Legislature (1870) as the representative of Headingley
 John Taylor, a Métis farmer and politician who represented Headingley from 1875 to 1879 in the Legislative Assembly of Manitoba

See also

 Headingley Correctional Institution
 Division No. 11, Manitoba

References

Further reading 

 Peterson, Murray and Taillieu, Georgia. 2003. Headingley pioneers, past and present: a historic look at life in Headingley, Manitoba. Headingley Historical Society.

External links 
 www.rmofheadingley.ca - Official RM of Headingley website

 
Headingley
Headingley